Gordon Johnson may refer to:

Gordon Johnson (cyclist) (born 1946), Australian cyclist
Gordon Johnson (historian) (born 1943), British historian
Gordon Johnson (musician) (born 1952), American bass guitarist
Gordon M. Johnson (born 1949), American politician
Gordie Johnson, Canadian musician
Gordon Johnson (golfer), see Northern Texas PGA Championship

See also
Gordon Johnston (disambiguation)